Nenjathai Killadhe is a 2008 Indian Tamil-language romantic drama film written and directed by Agathiyan, starring Vikranth and Bharathi. The music was composed by Premji Amaran, while the lyrics were penned by the director Agathiyan himself and the editing was done by J. N. Harsha. The film released on Valentine's Day (February 14) of 2008. The film opened to mixed reviews, and it became a box office bomb.

Plot
A rich boy Vasanth (Vikranth) indulges in various bizarre experiments to have different experiences. He eats in a five-star hotel without money, wears a woman's outfit in a showroom, goes to jail just for the sake of it, and hires a sex worker and lets her sleep alone. Meanwhile, Anandhi (Bharathi), the daughter of an NRI, stays alone in the city. She is making a documentary film on people belonging to the fringe world. She meets the prison convicts and sex workers for her documentary. Surprisingly, sparks do not fly when Vasan and Anandhi meet. In fact, she develops a sort of aversion towards his behavior but is impressed with him when she hears about his experience with the sex worker. Anandhi cannot believe that a boy can behave like this. According to her, the physical proximity would definitely lead to love or sex between a boy and girl. Vasan denies. He and Anandhi challenge each other and set for an experiment. Vasan emerges the winner, while Anandhi is impressed by Vasan's sensitive behavior and gentle gestures. Anandhi proposes to Vasan, but he refuses to accept her love. When she insists him to accept her, he makes a mockery about her feelings. Anandhi is deeply hurt. She is shocked to see Vasan, who approaches life just as a bunch of experiments to gain varied experiences. She feels cheated and humiliated. Later on, Vasan realizes the dormant love within him and comes back to Anandhi, but she is not ready to accept him. She cannot believe that he can get into real love. Her dejection and conviction are too strong to consider his change. Now, Vasan challenges that Anandhi would make her love him, and she accepts the challenge. The emotional game between them leads to an unpredictable climax.

Cast
Vikranth as Vasanth "Vasan"
Bharathi as Anandhi
Vikramaditya as Aravind
Yugendran as Inspector Meyyappan
Manivannan as Vasanth's father
Saranya Ponvannan as Vasanth false mother
Nizhalgal Ravi as Psychiatrist
Thalaivasal Vijay as Anandhi's father
Ganeshkar as Raja Raja Chozhan
Alex as Waiter

Soundtrack
The soundtrack was composed by Premji Amaran while the lyrics were penned by the director Agathiyan himself.
"Kadhale Nee" - Vijay Yesudas
"Naanga Beer" - Naveen, Ranjith, Premji
"Naane Naana" - Srimadhumitha
"Hello Hello" - Ranjith, Sunitha Sarathy
"Naera Varattuma" - Prasanna, Mahathi
"Oru Manasula" - Haricharan, Chinmayi
"Nenjathai Killathe" - Yugendran, Prashanthini

Reception
The movie received mixed reviews. This movie was an experimentation to love according to Indiaglitz. Behindwoods also reported that the film might not be likeable for everyone.

References

External links

Indian drama films
2008 drama films
2008 films
2000s Tamil-language films
Films directed by Agathiyan
Films scored by Premgi Amaren